Topaz is the 10th studio album by the American Jazz group The Rippingtons. It was released in 1999 for the Windham Hill label. The album reached No. 2 on Billboard's contemporary jazz chart.

Track listing

Personnel 

The Rippingtons
 Russ Freeman – keyboards (1, 2, 3, 5-8), acoustic guitar (1, 6, 10), classical guitar (1, 4, 5, 7), bajo sexto (1, 6), bass (1, 2, 6, 8, 10), guitar (2, 3), electric guitar (4, 6, 8, 9)
 Bill Heller – keyboards (1, 2, 3, 5-10), organ (9), grand piano (10)
 Kim Stone – bass (3, 4, 7)
 David Hooper – drums (1, 2, 3, 5-10), percussion (7, 9)

Guest Musicians
 David Kochanski – acoustic piano (3, 4)
 Tom Gannaway – flamenco guitar (4)
 Tony Morales – drums (4)
 Steve Reid – percussion (4)
 Robert Tree Cody – pito (1, 6, 8)
 Paul Taylor – alto saxophone (3), soprano saxophone (5, 10)

Production
 Russ Freeman – producer, executive producer, arrangements, recording, mixing 
 Andi Howard – executive producer, management 
 Patrick Clifford – A&R
 Nick Sodano – recording, mixing 
 Doug Sax – mastering

Charts

References

External links
The Rippingtons-Topaz at Discogs
The Rippingtons-Topaz at AllMusic
The Rippingtons Official Website

1999 albums
Windham Hill Records albums
The Rippingtons albums